The Banu Nu'aym, also spelled al-Na'imeh, al-Na'im or al-Ne'im, are a large tribal confederation present in the Hauran and Golan Heights regions of Syria.

History
The Banu Nu'aym was the dominant tribe among the 1,122 Bedouin households in the Lajat lava field of the Hauran in the 16th century. They also accounted for 51 and 120 households in the nahiya (subdistrict) of al-Hula in 1523 and 1543, respectively. The Banu Nu'aym were also the second largest Arab tribe in the Beqaa Valley in 1551, accounting for 76 households. The tribe was raided in the Hauran in the early 1770s by Sheikh Zahir al-Umar, the practically autonomous Arab ruler of Palestine. During the 18th and 19th centuries, the Banu Nu'aym and Al Fadl tribes grazed their flocks of sheep in the Golan Heights.

At present, the Banu Nu'aym have largely urbanized and are one of the four largest tribal groups in the governorates of Daraa and Quneitra in southern Syria. The three other largest tribal groups in the region, the Zu'bi, Hariri and Rifa'i (the first two are large than the Banu Nu'aym) are generally considered to have originally stemmed from the Banu Nu'aym, though members of the Zu'bi and Hariri tribes are doubtful of the association. At the onset of the Syrian Civil War in 2011, the Banu Nu'aym predominated in the towns and villages of northwestern Daraa Governorate, namely the area between Shaykh Maskin and Nawa and Jasim in the Izra District and the north-central part of al-Sanamayn District, as well the abutting Quneitra Governorate to the west. During the civil war, the supreme commander of the Free Syrian Army's Southern Front, Brigadier-General Abdel-Illah al-Bashir, Colonel Abdo Na'imeh, belonged to the tribe. Several members of the Banu Nu'aym also live as Syrian expatriates in Saudi Arabia, Kuwait and the northern emirates of the United Arab Emirates.

References

Bibliography

Tribes of Syria
Daraa Governorate
History of Ottoman Syria